The Mitsubishi AAM-5 (Type 04 air-to-air missile) is a short-range air-to-air missile developed and produced by Mitsubishi Heavy Industries for the Japan Air Self-Defense Force. Development of the missile as a replacement for the AAM-3 (Type 90) missile commenced in 1991, and it has been operational since 2004.

Characteristics
Unlike the Type 90 guided missile, the AAM-5 does not have canard control surfaces, using thrust vectoring for high agility. The missile body has narrow strakes extending over most of its length.

The NEC manufactured seeker has also been improved. Addition of a triaxial gimbal to the infrared seeker has increased the field of view, and an infrared focal plane array multi-element seeker allows infrared imaging. In particular, the addition of an INS means mid-course updates and LOAL (Lock-on after launch) is possible. Terminal homing is via infrared imaging (IIR). In terms of generation, it is placed in the same generation as missiles such as the AIM-9X and IRIS-T.

Variants
AAM-5
Standard.
AAM-5B
Enhanced background discrimination capability and IRCCM. Seeker cooling time is extended by the adoption of a Stirling engine.

Operators

Japan Air Self-Defense Force
F-15J Eagle
Mitsubishi F-2

Gallery

Specifications
 Length: 3,105 mm
 Diameter: 130 mm
 Wing span: 440 mm
 Weight: 95 kg
 Guidance: AAM-5A: Terminal Infrared homing (IIR), INS+COLOS
 Guidance: AAM-5B: Terminal IIR with IRCCM, INS+COLOS)
 Warhead: blast fragmentation warhead
 Detonation Mechanism: laser proximity fuze and impact
 Range: 35 km
 Speed: Mach 3+

See also
IRIS-T - Similar missile
AAM-1
AAM-2
AAM-3
AAM-4

AAM-5
Military equipment introduced in the 2000s